Géza Toldi (11 February 1909 – 16 August 1985) was a Hungarian footballer. He played for Ferencvárosi TC, and from 1934 to 1938 for the Hungarian national team, serving as captain in 1936. He scored a goal in the 1938 FIFA World Cup.

Club career 
He grew up in the railway houses of Avar Street in Buda, Németvölgy. He began playing football in his place of residence, featuring for one of the local teams, ITE, in the fourth division of the youth championship, and he was pivotal in helping the club climb one division at a time almost every year, and in 1928 they also won the first division championship.

In 1928, he was noticed at the youth federation's Christmas round-robin tournament. He received offers from several teams, including Oradea and Ferencvárosi, and in the end, he chose the latter, staying with them for more than a decade, until 1939, and again from 1942 to 1943. He played in a total of 324 Nemzeti Bajnokság I matches, scoring 270 goals.

In 1939, Ferencvárosi lost 1-3 at the home of Bologna. In the second leg, the player, who was already considered "old," was added to the team due to injury. Ferencváros won 4-1, and the goals were all scored by Géza Toldi.

International career
Between 1929 and 1940, he earned 46 caps for Hungary and scored a total of 25 goals. The highlight of his international career came in the 1936-38 edition, where he scored 5 goals, a tally that includes a hat-tricks against Austria in a 5-3 win on 27 September 1936. With 10 goals in the Central European Cup, he is among the top goal scorers in the competition's history. Toldi was also part of the Hungary team that played in two World Cups in the 1930s, in 1934 and in 1938, helping his nation reach the final of the latter, which they lost 2-4 to Italy.

Managerial career
Between 1950 and 1954 he coached Danish top-flight side Odense Boldklub, before he became head coach for AGF Aarhus from 1954 to 1956, where he became the first coach to win the Danish double and in his first season in 1954–55, which also was the first championship and Danish Cup tournament AGF had won. He went on to win his second Danish Championship with AGF in 1955–56, then took over as head coach for the Belgium national football team, the "Red Devils", for six games from 27 October 1957 to 26 May 1958. He was succeeded by Constant Vanden Stock.

Thereafter, he became coach of the Belgian first division team K. Berchem Sport in 1958–59 and 1959–60, before he once again returned to Denmark to coach AGF Aarhus from 1960 to 1964, winning the double in 1960 and thus becoming the most successful coach in the club's very long history. He also coached B 1909.

International goals
Hungary score listed first, score column indicates score after each Sárosi goal.

Honours

Player

Club
Ferencváros
 Hungarian National Championship (4): 1928, 1932, 1934, 1938
 Hungarian Cup (4): 1928, 1933, 1935, 1943
 Mitropa Cup (1): 1937

International
Hungary
 FIFA World Cup runner-up: 1938
 Central European International Cup third place: 1931–32, 1933–35

Individual
 Nemzeti Bajnokság I: Top scorer 1933–34 with 27 goals

References

1909 births
1985 deaths
Footballers from Budapest
Hungarian football managers
Hungarian footballers
1934 FIFA World Cup players
1938 FIFA World Cup players
Hungary international footballers
Ferencvárosi TC footballers
Hungarian expatriate football managers
Expatriate football managers in Belgium
Expatriate football managers in Denmark
Expatriate football managers in Egypt
Hungarian expatriate sportspeople in Belgium
Hungarian expatriate sportspeople in Denmark
Hungarian expatriate sportspeople in Egypt
Vaasan Palloseura managers
Odense Boldklub managers
Aarhus Gymnastikforening managers
Zamalek SC managers
Belgium national football team managers
K. Berchem Sport managers
Boldklubben 1909 managers
Association football forwards